Antimony(III) oxide is the inorganic compound with the formula Sb2O3.  It is the most important commercial compound of antimony.  It is found in nature as the minerals valentinite and senarmontite.  Like most polymeric oxides, Sb2O3 dissolves in aqueous solutions with hydrolysis. A mixed arsenic-antimony oxide occurs in nature as the very rare mineral stibioclaudetite.

Production and properties
Global production of antimony(III) oxide  in 2012 was 130,000 tonnes, an increase from 112,600 tonnes in 2002. China produces the largest share followed by US/Mexico, Europe, Japan and South Africa and other countries (2%).

As of 2010, antimony(III) oxide was produced at four sites in EU27. It is produced via two routes, re-volatilizing of crude antimony(III) oxide and by oxidation of antimony metal.
Oxidation of antimony metal dominates in Europe. Several processes for the production of crude antimony(III) oxide or metallic antimony from virgin material. The choice of process depends on the composition of the ore and other factors.  Typical steps include mining, crushing and grinding of ore, sometimes followed by froth flotation and separation of the metal using pyrometallurgical processes (smelting or roasting) or in a few cases (e.g. when the ore is rich in precious metals) by hydrometallurgical processes. These steps do not take place in the EU but closer to the mining location.

Re-volatilizing of crude antimony(III) oxide
Step 1) Crude stibnite is oxidized to crude antimony(III) oxide using furnaces operating at approximately 500 to 1,000 °C. The reaction is the following:
2 Sb2S3  +  9 O2  →   2 Sb2O3  +  6 SO2
Step 2) The crude antimony(III) oxide is purified by sublimation.

Oxidation of antimony metal
Antimony metal is oxidized to antimony(III) oxide in furnaces. The reaction is exothermic. Antimony(III) oxide is formed through sublimation and recovered in bag filters. The size of the formed particles is controlled by process conditions in furnace and gas flow.  The reaction can be schematically described by:
4 Sb  +  3 O2   →   2 Sb2O3

Properties
Antimony(III) oxide is an amphoteric oxide. It dissolves in aqueous sodium hydroxide solution to give the meta-antimonite NaSbO2, which can be isolated as the trihydrate. Antimony(III) oxide also dissolves in concentrated mineral acids to give the corresponding salts, which hydrolyzes upon dilution with water. With nitric acid, the trioxide is oxidized to antimony(V) oxide.

When heated with carbon, the oxide is reduced to antimony metal. With other reducing agents such as sodium borohydride or lithium aluminium hydride, the unstable and very toxic gas stibine is produced. When heated with potassium bitartrate, a complex salt potassium antimony tartrate, KSb(OH)2•C4H2O6, is formed.

Structure
The structure of Sb2O3 depends on the temperature of the sample.  Dimeric Sb4O6 is the high temperature  (1560 °C) gas.  Sb4O6 molecules are bicyclic cages, similar to the related oxide of phosphorus(III), phosphorus trioxide.  The cage structure is retained in a solid that crystallizes in a cubic habit.  The Sb-O distance is 197.7 pm and the O-Sb-O angle of 95.6°.  This form exists in nature as the mineral senarmontite. Above 606 °C, the more stable form is orthorhombic, consisting of pairs of -Sb-O-Sb-O- chains that are linked by oxide bridges between the Sb centers.  This form exists in nature as the mineral valentinite.

Uses
The annual consumption of antimony(III) oxide in the United States and Europe is approximately 10,000 and 25,000 tonnes, respectively. The main application is as flame retardant synergist in combination with halogenated materials. The combination of the halides and the antimony is key to the flame-retardant action for polymers, helping to form less flammable chars. Such flame retardants are found in electrical apparatuses, textiles, leather, and coatings.

Other applications:
Antimony(III) oxide is an opacifying agent for glasses, ceramics and enamels.
Some specialty pigments contain antimony.
Antimony(III) oxide is a useful catalyst in the production of polyethylene terephthalate (PET plastic) and the vulcanization of rubber.

Safety
Antimony(III) oxide has suspected carcinogenic potential for humans. Its TLV is 0.5 mg/m3, as for most antimony compounds. No other human health hazards were identified for antimony(III) oxide, and no risks to human health and the environment were identified from the production and use of antimony trioxide in daily life.

References

Further reading
 Institut national de recherche et de sécurité (INRS), Fiche toxicologique nº 198 : Trioxyde de diantimoine, 1992.
 The Oxide Handbook, G.V. Samsonov, 1981, 2nd ed. IFI/Plenum,

External links
 International Antimony Association
 International Chemical Safety Card 0012
 Antimony Market And Price
 Société industrielle et chimique de l'Aisne

Antimony(III) compounds
Oxides
Inorganic pigments
IARC Group 2B carcinogens
Sesquioxides
Adamantane-like molecules
Flame retardants